John Graver Johnson (1841, Philadelphia, Pennsylvania – April 13, 1917, Philadelphia, Pennsylvania) was an American corporate lawyer and art collector. The Philadelphia law firm that he founded in 1863 continues under the name Saul Ewing. His collection of nearly 1,300 paintings forms the core of early European works at the Philadelphia Museum of Art.

Career 
The son of a blacksmith, he attended Philadelphia public schools, and apprenticed in the law offices of Benjamin & Murray Rush. He was admitted to the Philadelphia Bar in February 1863, and served briefly in the American Civil War. He had an extraordinary memory, reportedly memorizing Shakespeare plays as a youth, and reciting extended citations of law in the courtroom.

He argued 168 cases before the United States Supreme Court, beginning in 1884. He represented the Standard Oil Company, the Sugar Trust, the American Tobacco Company, and the Northern Securities Company; and was counsel for J. P. Morgan & Company, the Pennsylvania Railroad, the New York Central Railroad, the Baldwin Locomotive Company, the United States Steel Corporation, the Amalgamated Copper Company, the American Distilleries Company, and many other corporations and banks.

Johnson declined offers to be nominated to the United States Supreme Court from Presidents James Garfield and Grover Cleveland. President William McKinley unsuccessfully sought him to become U.S. Attorney General.

In an April 15, 1917 obituary, The New York Times called him, "the greatest lawyer in the English-speaking world," and, "probably less known to the general public in proportion to his importance than any other man in the United States."

Art collecting 

Johnson amassed one of the finest art collections in the United States. Relying on his own judgment and study, he concentrated on early-Renaissance Italian primitives, Spanish, Flemish, and Dutch paintings. He also bought works by artists who were his contemporaries, including Eduard Charlemont, Gustave Courbet, Mariano Fortuny, T. Alexander Harrison, Édouard Manet, Claude Monet, John Singer Sargent, and James Whistler. He made annual trips to Europe, and wrote a short memoir: Sight-Seeing in Berlin and Holland among Pictures (1892).

An assessment of the collection from 1914:

Family 

In 1875, he married Ida Powel Morrell, a widow with three small children. They had no children together. The family lived at 506 South Broad Street, and he later bought the adjacent house to store his art collection.

Bequest 
In his Will, Johnson left the collection to the City of Philadelphia with the provision that it be exhibited at 510 South Broad Street. A proposal to build a museum on the new Benjamin Franklin Parkway to house the collection was considered and abandoned. Following six years in storage, the City opened the house museum in November 1923, but the first two floors provided only enough room to display 275 works. More than 1,000 works were stored on the upper floors or in rented space elsewhere. In 1931, the unexhibited works were moved into storage at the newly built Philadelphia Museum of Art. The City's fire marshal subsequently found 510 South Broad Street not to be fireproof, and in June 1933 the 275 exhibited works were "temporarily" transferred to the Philadelphia Museum of Art. The City demolished the Broad Street house in the late-1950s to build a medical clinic.

Johnson's art was exhibited as a separate collection within the Philadelphia Museum of Art for more than 50 years. In the 1980s legal approval was granted for the Museum to integrate the works into its full collection. The current 100-year loan of the collection lasts until 2083.

Selected works from the Johnson Collection

Italian paintings

Flemish and Dutch paintings

Spanish and French paintings

19th century paintings

See also 
Henri Gabriel Marceau, curator of the Johnson Collection, 1929–1969

References 

 Barnie F. Winkelman, John G. Johnson, Lawyer and Art Collector, 1841–1917 (Philadelphia: University of Pennsylvania Press, 1942).

External links 

The John G. Johnson Collection: A History and Selected Works, 2017, Philadelphia Museum of Art.

 Catalogue of the John G. Johnson Collection (1914), from Google Books.
 "John G. Johnson's Art," Time Magazine, November 10, 1941.
 John G. Johnson Papers, Philadelphia Museum of Art.
 John G. Johnson: Collector of Contemporary Art, 1988 exhibition, Philadelphia Museum of Art.
 "John G. Johnson, Giant of the Philadelphia Bar," from Philadelphia Bar Association.

1841 births
1917 deaths
American art collectors
Members of the Philadelphia Club
Pennsylvania lawyers
Lawyers from Philadelphia
People associated with the Philadelphia Museum of Art
University of Pennsylvania Law School alumni
19th-century American lawyers